Cláudio Lima (born 7 June 1948) is a Brazilian water polo player. He competed in the men's tournament at the 1968 Summer Olympics.

References

External links
 

1948 births
Living people
Brazilian male water polo players
Olympic water polo players of Brazil
Water polo players at the 1968 Summer Olympics
Sportspeople from Rio Grande do Sul